Bulbophyllum santosii is a species of orchid in the genus Bulbophyllum. It is endemic to the Philippines.

References
The Bulbophyllum-Checklist
The Internet Orchid Species Photo Encyclopedia

External links
Bulbophyllum santosii on orchidspecies.com

santosii